Georg Späth (born 24 February 1981) is a German former ski jumper who competed from 1998 to 2013. He won a silver medal on the normal hill team event at the 2005 FIS Nordic World Ski Championships in Oberstdorf and finished fifth on the individual normal hill at those same championships.

Späth won a bronze medal in the team event at the 2006 FIS Ski Flying World Championships. His best individual finish at the Winter Olympics was 12th on the individual normal hill in Pragelato in 2006.

References

Official website 

1981 births
German male ski jumpers
Living people
Olympic ski jumpers of Germany
Ski jumpers at the 2006 Winter Olympics
FIS Nordic World Ski Championships medalists in ski jumping
People from Oberstdorf
Sportspeople from Swabia (Bavaria)
21st-century German people